Hositea is a genus of moths of the family Crambidae.

Species
Hositea bicincta Schaus, 1913
Hositea cyanops Munroe, 1970
Hositea gynaecia Dyar, 1910
Hositea punctigera Munroe, 1970
Hositea regina Munroe, 1970

References

Midilinae
Crambidae genera
Taxa named by Harrison Gray Dyar Jr.